Wu Xiang may refer to:

Wu Xiang (Ming general)
Wu Xiang (athlete)
Five-spice powder, or Wuxiang powder
Ngo Hiang, or Wuxiang

See also
 Wu Xian (disambiguation)